Authenticity is the third studio album by the Foreign Exchange, released in 2010. It peaked at number 145 on the Billboard 200 chart.

Track listing

Charts

References

External links
 

2010 albums
The Foreign Exchange albums
Albums produced by Nicolay (musician)